Qassabali Sara (also Romanized as Qaşşāb‘alī Sarā) is a village in Lulaman Rural District, in the Central District of Fuman County, Gilan Province, Iran. At the 2006 census, its population was 347, in 91 families.

References 

Populated places in Fuman County